Zuriñe Rodríguez (born 21 May 1982) is a Spanish triathlete. She competed in the Women's event at the 2012 Summer Olympics.

References

External links
 

1982 births
Living people
Spanish female triathletes
Olympic triathletes of Spain
Triathletes at the 2012 Summer Olympics
Sportspeople from Barakaldo
Triathletes from the Basque Country (autonomous community)
20th-century Spanish women
21st-century Spanish women